Mary Sewell may refer to:
 Mary Wright Sewell, English poet and children's author
 Mary A. Sewell, New Zealand marine biology academic